Puttu ((pronounced ), also called pittu ) in Sri Lanka, is a dish native to the Sri Lanka and South Indian states of Kerala, Tamil Nadu, and parts of Karnataka. Puttu means "portioned" in Tamil and Malayalam. It is made of steamed cylinders of ground rice layered with coconut shavings, sometimes with a sweet or savory filling on the inside. Puttu is usually a breakfast dish served hot with either sweet side dishes such as palm sugar or banana, or savoury with chana masala, chutney, rasam, or meat curries.

Ingredients

Puttu principally consists of coarsely ground rice, grated coconut, little salt and water. It is often spiced with cumin, but may have other spices. The Sri Lankan variant is usually made with wheat flour or red rice flour without cumin, whereas the Bhatkal recipes have plain coconut or masala variant made with mutton- or shrimp-flavoured grated coconut.

In Bangladesh, the outside is made of a mixture of rice flour and ground moong dal, while the filling is a mixture of coconut flakes and a type of caramelized sugar that is similar to dulce de leche.

Preparation

Puttu is made by slowly adding water to ground rice until the correct texture is achieved. Using hot water would improve the softness of puttu. It is then spiced, formed and steamed with layers of grated coconut.

Puttu is generally cooked in a aluminium puttu kutti vessel with two sections. The lower section holds water and the upper section holds the puttu, where the rice mixture is inserted with layers of grated coconut. Perforated lids separate the sections to allow the steam to pass between them.

A number of alternative cooking vessels are used, such as traditional vessels where a perforated coconut shell is attached to a section of bamboo, or a chiratta puttu made of a coconut shell or of metal shaped similarly to a coconut shell.

Other types of cooking vessels include a pan similar to an idli pan with small holes in the bottom, pressure cookers and, mainly in the Malay Archipelago, hollow bamboo stalks.

Serving
Puttu is often served along with gravies, like fish curry, chicken curry, beef curry or kadala (chickpea) curry, and papadum. Also plantain, jackfruit, mango or banana is commonly served with it. In southern Kerala people eat puttu accompanied by sweet black coffee. 

In Tamil Nadu it is served with grated coconut with jaggery made of palm sugar or sugar cane, or with sweetened coconut milk.

In Sri Lanka, pittu is usually accompanied with tripe curry, fish or a meat curry, coconut milk and a sambol. 

In Kerala, puttu is served with banana or plantain, kadala curry, payar (green lentils) thoran with papad, fish or meat curry. 

There are also many improvisations and experiments done on puttu in Kerala. Wheat and maize flours are used instead of rice in certain parts. There are also puttu-specialised restaurants that serve it with different fillings.

Variations

Some variations of puttu use other grains such as wheat flour, ragi (finger millet) flour, tapioca and corn flour. The layered filling of coconut can be replaced by other foods, such as egg curry or banana. Puttu prepared in a ball shape are called manipputtu. Puttu can also be made using bamboo rice.

Muslims in Kerala eat a version of puttu called irachiputti in which rice is layered with spiced mincemeat.

Puttu is also very common in Mauritius. It is usually sold by hawkers and is served as a snack. It is often misspelled poutou and should be spelled putu in Mauritian Creole. The ingredients are the same—rice flour, sugar and desiccated coconut, but cooked in metal cylinders.

Similar dishes

In Maritime Southeast Asia, there are numerous similar dessert dishes known as kue putu in Indonesian, putu bambu in Malay, putu piring in Singapore and puto bumbong in Tagalog. They vary by preparation and ingredients but are also steamed in bamboo tubes and are served with sugar and grated coconut.

In Indonesia, kue putu is characteristically green due to the use of pandan flavoring. It is commonly found being sold by traveling vendor carts together with klepon, which is actually ball-shaped kue putu.

In the Philippines, puto bumbong is deep purple in color due to the use of a unique rice variety called pirurutong. They are culturally significant as a common traditional Christmas dessert. Puto in the Philippines is also a general term for traditional steamed rice cakes.

World record attempt
In 2006, students of the Oriental school of Hotel Management in Wayanad in north Kerala made a 10-foot-long puttu. They cooked the giant puttu in a specially designed 12-foot-long aluminium mould, using 20 coconuts and 26 kg of powdered rice. It took about one and a half hours to cook.

See also

 Tamil cuisine
 Cuisine of Kerala
 Bhapa pitha
 Sunga Pitha
 Kue putu
 Puto
 List of steamed foods
 Idli

References

External links

Indian cuisine
Tamil cuisine
Kerala cuisine
Sri Lankan Tamil culture
Rice dishes
Foods containing coconut
Steamed foods
Sri Lankan rice dishes
Mauritian cuisine